USS Magpie (AMc-2) was a Pipit-class coastal minesweeper acquired by the United States Navy for use in World War II. Her task was to clear minefields in coastal waterways.

Magpie was built as F/V City of San Pedro in 1936 by Harbor Boat Building Co., Terminal Island, California; acquired by the U.S. Navy on 18 October 1940; converted from a fishing trawler by Harbor Boat Building Co.; renamed Magpie on 29 October 1940; and placed in service on 28 March 1941.

World War II West Coast operations 
Assigned to the 15th Naval District, Magpie departed San Pedro, California, on 10 May 1941 for the Panama Canal Zone, arriving 22 May. She performed minesweeping and patrol operations out of Balboa, Panama, until 7 August 1944 when she departed for the west coast, arriving San Diego, California, on 26 August.

Decommissioning 
Magpie was placed out of service at San Pedro, California, on 6 October 1944; struck from the Navy List on 22 December 1944; and delivered to War Shipping Administration for return sale to her former owner on 5 February 1945.

References

External links 
 

Ships built in Los Angeles
1936 ships
Pipit-class coastal minesweepers
World War II minesweepers of the United States